Pretend You Don't See Her is a 2002 television film directed by René Bonnière and starring Emma Samms, Hannes Jaenicke, Beau Starr, Reiner Schöne, and Kim Poirier. It is based on the novel by Mary Higgins Clark.

Plot summary
Lacey Farrell (Emma Samms), a young rising star on Manhattan's high-powered and competitive real estate scene is in the course of selling a luxurious apartment when she becomes the witness to a murder and hears the dying words of the victim, a woman convinced that her attacker was after a journal kept by her recently deceased daughter Heather up until the day she died in a hit-and-run, what everyone believes to be a tragic accident.

Cast
 Emma Samms as Lacey Farrell
 Hannes Jaenicke as Curtis Caldwell Blake
 Beau Starr as Detective Ed Sloan
 Reiner Schöne as Jimmy Greco
 Stewart Bick as Ken Lynch 
 Laura Press as Chantal Greco
 Carolyn Dunn as Kitt Taylor
 Fulvio Cecere as Baldwin 
 Richard Eden as Steve Smith
 Philip Akin as Witness Protection Agent  
 Rod Wilson as Jay Taylor
 William Colgate as Svenson 
 Tom Melissis as Ron Parker  
 Danielle Bouffard as Bonnie Taylor
 Lyriq Bent as Detective 
 Kim Poirier as Heather Greco

References

External links
 
 
 

2002 television films
2002 films
2002 crime drama films
American crime drama films
American mystery films
British crime drama films
British mystery films
Canadian crime drama films
Canadian mystery films
Canadian drama television films
English-language Canadian films
Films based on American novels
Films based on mystery novels
Films based on thriller novels
Films set in Manhattan
Films set in Minnesota
American drama television films
2000s English-language films
2000s American films
2000s Canadian films
2000s British films
British drama television films